The Acharapakkam block is a revenue block in the Chengalpattu district of Tamil Nadu, India. It has a total of 59 panchayat villages.

References 
 

Revenue blocks in Chengalpattu district